Etifoxine, sold under the brand name Stresam among others, is a nonbenzodiazepine anxiolytic medication which is used in the short-term treatment of adjustment disorder (situational depression) with anxiety, for instance stress-related anxiety. It is taken by mouth.

Side effects of etifoxine include slight drowsiness, headache, skin eruptions, and allergic reactions. Rarely, etifoxine can cause severe skin toxicity and liver toxicity as well as menstrual bleeding between periods. It does not produce the sedation and muscle incoordination associated with benzodiazepines. Etifoxine acts as a GABAA receptor positive allosteric modulator and as a translocator protein ligand. Both actions are thought to be involved in its anxiolytic effects.

Etifoxine was developed in the 1960s and was introduced for medical use in France in 1979. It has been marketed in 53countries worldwide. The drug is not available in the United States. In the 2010s and early 2020s, etifoxine was reviewed in France and the European Union following reports of toxicity. It was found that instances of toxicity were rare, and etifoxine was allowed to remain on the market.

Medical uses
Etifoxine has historically been used in the treatment of "psychosomatic manifestations of anxiety", for instance "autonomic dystonia, particularly with cardiovascular expression". Subsequently, the indication for etifoxine has been more formalized as treatment of adjustment disorder (situational depression) with anxiety (ADWA) (e.g., stress-related anxiety). Etifoxine has been found to reduce scores on the Hamilton Anxiety Rating Scale (HAM-A) in people with adjustment disorder with anxiety by approximately 50 to 75% after 4weeks of treatment in clinical trials (e.g., AMETIS, ETILOR, ETIZAL, STRETI studies). The medication is similarly effective or more effective than benzodiazepines like lorazepam, alprazolam, and clonazepam and more effective than buspirone for adjustment disorder with anxiety on the basis of directly comparative randomized controlled trials. However, in the AMETIS study, both etifoxine and lorazepam failed to show greater effectiveness over placebo.

The usual dosage of etifoxine (as the hydrochloride salt) is 150 to 200mg per day in divided doses of 50 to 100mg two to three times per day (e.g., 50mg–50mg–100mg). It is taken for a few days to a few weeks, but no longer than 12weeks.

Available forms
Etifoxine is provided in the form of oral capsules containing 50mg etifoxine hydrochloride.

Contraindications
Etifoxine is contraindicated in people with circulatory shock, severe liver impairment, severe kidney impairment, myasthenia gravis, galactosemia (due to lactose in the drug formulation), severe respiratory failure, and hypersensitivity (allergy) to etifoxine. The medication is not recommended in children or adolescents under the age of 18 and is not recommended during pregnancy and breastfeeding due to insufficient data. Caution is warranted with regard to combining etifoxine and other central depressants such as benzodiazepines, central analgesics, antipsychotics, sedative antihistamines, and alcohol.

Side effects
Side effects of etifoxine include slight drowsiness and headache. Rarely, etifoxine can cause benign skin eruptions or rashes and allergic reactions such as hives and angioedema. Etifoxine shows less adverse effects of anterograde amnesia, sedation, impaired psychomotor performance, and withdrawal syndromes than those of benzodiazepines. No cases of misuse or dependence with etifoxine were identified in a French pharmacovigilance survey, which is also in contrast to benzodiazepines.

Etifoxine has been associated rarely with cases of severe dermal toxicity and liver toxicity. Skin and subcutaneous disorders are the most frequently reported, but these generally resolve after drug cessation. A 2012 review of etifoxine by the French National Pharmacovigilance Committee determined that etifoxine was safe and continued to provide a favorable alternative to benzodiazepine anxiolytics. The committee found (for a ten-year pharmacovigilance period) that safety concerns were rare or very rare and that the incidence of idiosyncratic hepatic (liver) problems were very rare.

Pharmacology

Pharmacodynamics
Unlike benzodiazepines, etifoxine may produce its anxiolytic effects through a dual mechanism, by directly binding to GABAA receptors and (purportedly, exact binding site undetermined) to the mitochondrial translocator protein (TSPO). This results in stimulation of the biosynthesis of endogenous neurosteroids, for instance allopregnanolone, a highly potent GABAA receptor positive allosteric modulator.

At GABAA receptors etifoxine binds at the α+β− interface and preferentially potentiates α2β3γ2 and α3β3γ2 receptor types. This direct allosteric potentiation can only be observed at relatively high concentrations (starting at >1mM) and is perhaps not physiologically relevant at normal human doses. This is different from benzodiazepines and etifoxine can be used alongside benzodiazepines to potentiate their effects without competing for binding sites; however, it also means that the direct effects of etifoxine are not reversed by the benzodiazepine antagonist flumazenil.

Pharmacokinetics
Etifoxine is taken via oral administration. It is rapidly absorbed from the gastrointestinal tract. It is well-absorbed, with a bioavailability of 90%. The time to peak levels of etifoxine is 2 to 3hours. The plasma protein binding of etifoxine is 88 to 95%. It does not bind to blood cells. The drug is known to cross the placental barrier. Etifoxine is metabolized in the liver into several metabolites. One of these metabolites, diethyletifoxine, is pharmacologically active. The elimination half-life of etifoxine is 6hours and of diethyletifoxine is almost 20hours. Etifoxine is eliminated in three phases. The drug is excreted mainly in urine in the form of metabolites. It is also excreted in bile. Only small amounts are excreted unchanged.

Chemistry
Etifoxine is a nonbenzodiazepine—that is, it is similarly a GABAA receptor positive allosteric modulator but its chemical structure is distinct from that of benzodiazepines. Instead, it is a benzoxazine derivative.

Etifoxine is used pharmaceutically as the hydrochloride salt.

(S)-Etifoxine, the (S) enantiomer of etifoxine, was under development by Anvyl Pharmaceuticals for the treatment of neuropathic pain, but development was discontinued. A deuterated form of etifoxine with improved pharmacokinetics known as deuterated etifoxine (GRX-917) is under development by GABA Therapeutics for the treatment anxiety and mood disorders.

History
Etifoxine was developed by Hoechst in the 1960s. It was introduced for medical use in France in 1979. Since at least 2000, etifoxine has been marketed by the French pharmaceutical company Biocodex. Following reports of post-marketing toxicity, the safety of etifoxine was reassessed by the French government and the European Medicines Agency (EMA). In January 2022, the EMA "finalized its review of Stresam and concluded that the medicine can continue to be used for the treatment of anxiety disorders, but it must not be used in patients who previously had severe skin reactions or severe liver problems after taking etifoxine."

Society and culture

Names
It is also known by the older and much-lesser-used synonym etafenoxine and by its developmental code name Hoe 36801. Etifoxine is marketed under the brand name Stresam. It has also been marketed under the brand name Strezam, specifically in Russia.

Availability
Etifoxine has been marketed in 53countries as of 2022. Some of the countries in which etifoxine has been marketed include Argentina, Bulgaria, Chile, France, Luxembourg, Malta, Romania, Russia, South Africa, Thailand, and Ukraine. Etifoxine is not approved for use by the United States Food and Drug Administration (FDA) or the European Medicines Agency (EMA) of the European Union, and hence is not marketed in these regions. However, etifoxine is marketed in four European Union member states (Bulgaria, Luxembourg, Malta, Romania).

See also
 Alpidem

References

Further reading

External links
 Stesam (etifoxine hydrochloride) Summary of Product Characteristics (SPC)
 Stresam (etifoxine hydrochloride) Patient Leaflet
 Stresam (etifoxine hydrochloride) Package Insert
 Etifoxine French Commission Nationale de Pharmacovigilance Review (Original French)
 Etifoxine French Commission Nationale de Pharmacovigilance Review (English Translation)
 Etifoxine European Medicines Agency Assessment Report

Anxiolytics
Benzoxazines
Chloroarenes
Dermatoxins
GABAA receptor positive allosteric modulators
Hepatotoxins
TSPO ligands